Carlos Samayoa Chinchilla (December 10, 1898–1973) was a Guatemalan writer. For decades he worked in various roles in the government of Guatemala, but is best remembered for his writing, both fiction and non fiction.

He worked as personal secretary for President Jorge Ubico; after Ubico's death he published the memoir El Dictador y Yo ("The Dictator and I"). He afterwards served as director of the Instituto de Antropología e Historia (IDAEH), Guatemala's national institution of anthropology, archaeology, and history, and wrote a number of works on those subjects.  In 1957, Falcon's Wing Press in Colorado published a collection of his short stories, "The Emerald Lizard:  Tales and Legends of Guatemala."

Samayoa Chinchilla wrote "El arco de Balam-Acab" (The Bow of Balam-Acab), included in a book of stories and legends, Madre Milpa in 1934.

He was married to well-known poet Claudia Lars.

References 

1898 births
1973 deaths
Guatemalan male writers
Guatemalan anthropologists
Ethnographers
Mayanists
20th-century Guatemalan historians
Guatemalan Mesoamericanists
20th-century Mesoamericanists
Historians of Mesoamerica
20th-century anthropologists